Albert M. Spradling Jr. (March 13, 1920 – October 20, 2004) was an American politician from Cape Girardeau, Missouri, who served in the Missouri Senate.  He served as city attorney of Cape Girardeau from 1948 until 1952 when he was elected to the state senate.  Spradling was educated in the Cape Girardeau public schools and at the local Southeast Missouri State College and at the University of Missouri.  He served in the Missouri Senate for 25 years and as president pro tem for four years in the early 1960s.  During World War II, Spradling worked as an FBI agent in California.

His son Albert M. Spradling, III served as mayor of Cape Girardeau from 1994 until 2002.

References

1920 births
2004 deaths
Central High School (Cape Girardeau, Missouri) alumni
Federal Bureau of Investigation agents
Democratic Party Missouri state senators
People from Cape Girardeau, Missouri
Southeast Missouri State University alumni
20th-century American politicians